Several naval ships of Germany were named Bussard after the buteo:

  (cruiser):  1,650 ton  light cruiser, launched 1890
 :   (Type 141) fast attack craft, commissioned 1959 to 1975
 :   (Type 143) fast attack craft, decommissioned

German Navy ship names